"The White People" is a horror short story by Welsh author Arthur Machen. Written in the late 1890s, it was first published in 1904 in Horlick's Magazine, edited by Machen's friend A. E. Waite, then reprinted in Machen's collection The House of Souls (1906).

The story has since been described as an important example of horror fiction, influencing generations of later writers.

Synopsis
A discussion between two men on the nature of evil leads one of them to reveal a mysterious Green Book he possesses. It is a young girl's diary, in which she describes in ingenuous, evocative prose her strange impressions of the countryside in which she lives as well as conversations with her nurse, who initiates her into a secret world of folklore and black magic. Throughout, the girl makes cryptic allusions to such topics as "nymphs", "Dôls", "voolas," "white, green, and scarlet ceremonies", "Aklo letters", the "Xu" and "Chian" languages, "Mao games", and a game called "Troy Town" (the last of which is a reference to actual practices involving labyrinths or labyrinthine dances). The girl's tale gradually develops a mounting atmosphere of suspense, with suggestions of witchcraft, only to break off abruptly just at the point where a supreme revelation seems imminent. In a return to the frame story, the diary's custodian reveals that the girl's body was later found dead near a seemingly pagan statue in the woods. He adds that she had "poisoned herself—in time", making the analogy of a child finding the key to a locked medicine cabinet.

Background
The story was written in the late 1890s as part of Machen's struggle to find a direction for a projected novel, other outgrowths of which were published as the novella A Fragment of Life (collected in The House of Souls) and as the collection of prose poems Ornaments in Jade (1924). Machen had read widely in mystical literature and folklore ever since an early employer had set him to work cataloguing occult books, and his learning gave his tale a depth and verisimilitude unusual in such works.

The use of the Green Book as a false document has roots in the Gothic tradition and is similar to the use of such documents by Bram Stoker in Dracula and to H. P. Lovecraft's use of the Necronomicon and Wilbur Whateley's diary in "The Dunwich Horror". Some of the strange words and names in the Green Book are actual occult terms, but most were invented by Machen for the story. Of these, some would be picked up by later authors of weird fiction—notably "Aklo", which was used by Lovecraft in connection with the "Sabaoth" invocation in "The Dunwich Horror".

Reception and influence
The story has frequently been reprinted, and scholars and devotees of supernatural fiction often cite it as a classic of the genre. E. F. Bleiler wrote that the narrative in the Green Book "is probably the finest single supernatural story of the century, perhaps in the literature", and Michael Dirda has stated: "If I were to list the greatest supernatural short stories of all time, I would start with Arthur Machen’s 'The White People,' about a young girl’s unknowing initiation into an ancient, otherworldly cult." S. T. Joshi has called the diary "a masterpiece of indirection, a Lovecraft plot told by James Joyce", and H. P. Lovecraft himself wrote that "Machen's narrative, a triumph of skilful selectiveness and restraint, accumulates enormous power as it flows on in a stream of innocent childish prattle".

As has been intimated above, Lovecraft adopted some of Machen's techniques and terminology for use in his Cthulhu Mythos stories. The story has also served as the inspiration for T. E. D. Klein's novel The Ceremonies and may have been an influence on the plot of Guillermo del Toro's film Pan's Labyrinth. The 2019 novel The Twisted Ones by T. Kingfisher (Ursula Vernon) is a contemporary take on the story.

See also

Caerdroia

References

External links

The House of Souls at Project Gutenberg
Gaslight — "The White People" as a free etext
"The Shock of the Numinous: Arthur Machen's 'The White People'" at the Weird Review
 

1904 short stories
British short stories
Horror short stories
Works originally published in British magazines
Works originally published in literary magazines
Welsh horror fiction
Anglo-Welsh literature
Works by Arthur Machen